Artistic gymnastics was contested at the 2019 Summer Universiade from July 3 to 7, and rhythmic gymnastics was contested from July 11 to 13. Both events were held at the PalaVesuvio in Naples, Italy.

Medalists

Medal table

Artistic gymnastics

Men's events

Women's events

Rhythmic gymnastics

Individual

Group

Men's Artistic Events

Team

All-around

Floor

Pommel horse

Rings

Vault

Parallel bars

Horizontal bar

Women's Artistic Events

Team

All-around

Vault

Uneven bars

Balance beam

Floor

Individual Rhythmic Events

All-around

Hoop

Ball

Clubs

Ribbon

Group Rhythmic Events

Squads

All-around

5 balls

3 hoops + 4 clubs

References

External links
2019 Summer Universiade – Artistic gymnastics
2019 Summer Universiade – Rhythmic gymnastics
Results book – Artistic gymnastics
Results book – Rhythmic gymnastics

 
Universiade
2019 Summer Universiade events
Gymnastics at the Summer Universiade